Lau Siu Ming (born 13 October 1931) is a Hong Kong dancer and actor. He started his acting career in TVB. He starred in the movie "The Butterfly Murders" for the first time in 1979. Though he is best known for his roles in The Legend of the Condor Heroes, the 1990 martial arts movie Swordsman, A Chinese Ghost Story, A Chinese Ghost Story II, and A Chinese Ghost Story III. In 2006, he was nominated for the Best Supporting Actor Award at the 11th Hong Kong Golden Bauhinia Awards for playing Uncle Ghost in the movie Re-cycle.

Early life 
Lau Siu-ming was born in 1931, and his ancestral home is Longkou Town, Heshan City, Jiangmen, Guangdong. When he was young, he traveled across the ocean alone and worked as a warehouse worker on a cruise ship. Later, he was awarded a scholarship to dance at the Classical Ballet Research Center in Cannes, France.

Career 
Lau Siu-ming has profound attainments in dance. He is one of the pioneers of the Hong Kong dance industry and the first Hong Kong dancer to emerge internationally. Later, he opened a dance school to train young actors, so he was called "Ming sir".

His first acting role was in the movie "The Butterfly Murders" in 1979.

In 1987, starred in the costume film "A Chinese Ghost Story" directed by Tsui Hark and Cheng Xiaodong, starring Leslie Cheung and Wang Zuxian. In the film, he successfully portrayed the yin and yang of the dryad grandma; It achieved good box office results and made costume ghost films become the trend of Hong Kong films again.

In 1994, starred in the love drama "Goodbye, My Wife" directed by Li Guoli, and played Dong Liguang in the series; in the same year, starred in the action film "Drunken Master II" directed by Liu Jialiang, starring Jackie Chan and Anita Mui, and played Chiu in the series; With a box office of 40.97 million Hong Kong dollars, the film won the annual runner-up of the Hong Kong box office, and was selected as "one of the top ten films in the world in 1994" by the American "Time Magazine".

In 2001, Lau Siu-ming accepted the invitation to perform Hong Kong Ballet's "White Snake" and Hong Kong Dance Company's "Blessings of Love". With his years of performing arts experience, he led the two stage plays and was awarded the 2002 Hong Kong Dance Award.

On June 27, 2007, at the age of 76, Lau Siu-ming was awarded the title of Honorary Fellow by the Hong Kong Academy for Performing Arts in recognition of his achievements.

In 2009, starred in the commercial war drama "Fuguimen" directed by Zhuang Weijian, starring Lu Liangwei and Yuan Anita, and played Dong Tianzhu in the series. In 2010, together with Chung King Fai and Lu Weiluan (Xiao Si), he won the Outstanding Artistic Contribution Award of the "2009 Hong Kong Arts Development Award".

On December 16, 2013, Lau Siu-ming won the 46th TVB Thousands of Stars Performing Artist Award.

Personal life 
Lau Siu-ming's wife of 50 years, Cheung Wai Ling, died of cancer. On October 31, 2012, a funeral ceremony was held at the Holy Cross Church in Sai Wan Ho. Friends in the circle, Liu Songyan, Huang Qiusheng, Guo Aiming and Chen Jinhong, etc. attended the ceremony.

Filmography

Television series

Films

References

External links
 

1931 births
20th-century Hong Kong male actors
21st-century Hong Kong male actors
Hong Kong male film actors
Hong Kong male television actors
People from Kowloon
Living people
Hong Kong dancers
Hong Kong male dancers